Upham is a civil parish in Kings County, New Brunswick, Canada.

For governance purposes it forms the local service district of the parish of Upham, which is a member of Regional Service Commission 8 (RSC8).

Origin of name
The parish was probably named in honour of Joshua Upham, Loyalist military commander and later judge on the Supreme Court of New Brunswick. Members of the Upham family settled in the area after Joshua's death.

History
Upham was erected in 1835 from Hampton Parish. It included Hammond Parish.

In 1858 Hammond was erected as its own parish.

The parish's boundary was rewritten in 1897, probably causing some change.

Boundaries
Upham Parish is bounded:

on the north by a line beginning at a point about 300 metres east of the Cumberland Road and about 900 metres south of its junction with the Passekeag Road, then running generally northeasterly along the old Westmorland Road to a point about 75 metres south of Byrnes Brook and 300 metres east-northeasterly of the Byrne Road, then easterly to a point about 825 metres north of the western end of Cassidy Lake at the prolongation of the eastern line of a grant to Samuel Deforest;
on the east by the prolongation of the eastern line of the Deforest grant, the grant line itself, which runs along a straight stretch of Route 865, and the southern prolongation of the grant line to the Saint John County line;
on the south by the Saint John County line;
on the west by a line beginning where the western line of a grant to Thomas Smith strikes the county line, west of the junction of Third Lake Road and Route 820, then running northwesterly to the rear of the Smith grant, east-northeasterly along the rear line of the grant and its prolongation to the northeastern corner of a grant to Robert Godfrey, about 825 metres south of an s-shaped meander of the Hammond River, then northerly along the eastern line of a grant to William Scoullar, including along the outside of the southern bend of the meander, to the end of the eastern line at the river, then upriver about 300 metres to the western line of a grant to J. C. Robertson, then north-northwesterly along the Robertson grant to its northeastern corner, then very slightly more northerly in a direct line through the northeastern corner of a grant to James Beyea to the starting point.

Governance
The entire parish forms the local service district of the parish of Upham, established in 1967 to assess for fire protection. Recreational and sports facilities were added in 2005. First aid and ambulance services (1976–2005) were formerly included.

Communities
Communities at least partly within the parish; italics indicate a name no longer in official use

Barnesville
Bloomfield Ridge
Clover Hill
Salina
Salt Springs
Titus Mills
Upham
Upper Salt Springs
Upperton

Bodies of water
Bodies of water at least partly in the parish:
Hammond River
South Stream

Demographics

Population
Population trend

Language
Mother tongue (2016)

Access Routes
Highways and numbered routes that run through the parish, including external routes that start or finish at the parish limits:

Highways
none

Principal Routes

Secondary Routes:

External Routes:
None

See also
List of parishes in New Brunswick

Notes

References

Local service districts of Kings County, New Brunswick
Parishes of Kings County, New Brunswick